Anna Anatolievna Narinskaya (born April 13, 1966, Leningrad, USSR) is a Russian journalist, literary critic, exhibition curator.

Biography
Anna was born in 1966. Her father was Yevgeny Rein, and her stepfather was Anatoly Naiman.

In 1990, she graduated from the philological faculty of Moscow State University. From 1993 to 1998, she worked at the Moscow office of the BBC television company as a producer of news and documentary films. Since 1997, she has been a writer and editor of culture articles for Expert Magazine. From 2003 to 2017, she was a writer, and later the special correspondent of the Kommersant Publishing House, covering the cultural policy and literary process. Since 2017, she has been a regular wrote for the newspaper, Novaya Gazeta.

References

External links
 Анна Наринская «Не зяблик. Рассказ о себе в заметках и дополнениях»

1966 births
Living people
Journalists from Saint Petersburg
20th-century Russian journalists
21st-century Russian journalists
Russian women journalists
Russian columnists
Russian women columnists
Russian literary critics
Women literary critics
Moscow State University alumni
Russian art curators
Russian women curators
Soviet Jews
Russian Jews
20th-century Russian women writers